Manu Narayan (born August 16, 1973) is an American actor, film producer, singer, songwriter, composer and saxophonist. He served as a Trustee of Carnegie Mellon University, his alma mater, from 2013-2016.

Narayan was hailed as a "promising young star...a compelling actor and outstanding singer who can light up a stage with sheer force of personality," by UPI in 2004 when he made his Broadway debut in the Andrew Lloyd Webber, A.R. Rahman musical Bombay Dreams, originating the role of the "hero" Akaash. Narayan co-starred as Rajneesh alongside Mike Myers in the Paramount Pictures' feature film The Love Guru (2008).

Early life 
Narayan was born in Pittsburgh, Pennsylvania.

He is an accomplished classical saxophonist in the western and South Indian Carnatic styles.  When Narayan was a freshman at Carnegie Mellon University in Pittsburgh, he won the Concerto Competition and performed the Glazunov Saxophone Concerto with orchestra at Carnegie Hall in Pittsburgh.  Narayan studied the Carnatic saxophone in Mangalore, India with Sri Kadri Gopalnath, and played on All India Radio as the winner of the All India Radio music competition of Mangalore.

Career

Actor
On stage, Narayan made his Broadway debut in the Andrew Lloyd Webber/A.R. Rahman musical Bombay Dreams in 2004, originating the role he is most widely known for, the "hero" Akaash, and garnered a New York Drama League nomination. Narayan co starred as Zoltan Karpathy in the original cast of Bartlett Sher's 2018 revival of My Fair Lady at Lincoln Center Theater.  That same year, he appeared as Robbie Patel in the Original Broadway cast of Gettin' The Band Back Together at the Belasco Theater.  Narayan created the role of Charlie Kringas in the 2019 Roundabout Theater / Fiasco off Broadway revival of Stephen Sondheim's Merrily We Roll Along and the role of Uncle Ernie in the Kennedy Center revival of The Who's Tommy. In 2021, he played Theo in Company on Broadway at the Bernard B. Jacobs Theatre, replacing Kyle Dean Massey, who left during previews.

Narayan appeared as Richard Roma in La Jolla Playhouse's critically acclaimed revival of Glengarry Glen Ross, receiving critical praise for his performance as well as a nomination for a 2012 San Diego Critics Circle Craig Noel Award.

Narayan starred as the romantic lead in Sudhish Kamath's Good Night Good Morning, which he co-produced, and Shailja Gupta's Walkaway. He co-starred with Lucy Hale in A Cinderella Story: Once Upon a Song and is featured in M. Night Shyamalan's The Last Airbender.  He also co-starred with Canadian comic Russell Peters in Quarterlife Crisis which was first broadcast on Showtime.

Musician
In 2003, Narayan was invited to sing at a small state dinner for the first official visit of President George W. Bush to the UK. Narayan sang for and met Queen Elizabeth II, the Royal Family, and President George W. Bush and Colin Powell. He also sang for then Senator John Kerry's presidential campaign, sponsored by Senator Hillary Clinton, as well as elsewhere with Cyndi Lauper, The Band's Garth Hudson and Martha Wainwright.

As a recording artist, Narayan has collaborated on and recorded original and cover tracks for feature film soundtracks including The Love Guru, A Cinderella Story: Once Upon a Song, Good Night Good Morning and Walkaway. He co-wrote and recorded the single Help Me to Find for the film Hiding Divya starring Madhur Jaffrey. Narayan has collaborated with Grammy winner Frank London numerous times around the world, most recently recording and performing for his Soundbrush Records' klezmer concept album, A Night in the Old Marketplace. As the lead vocalist, Narayan performed the concert version of the album throughout Europe and North America. He is currently working on a new klezmer/Desi collaboration called SHARABI with London and master percussionist Deep Singh, whom he performed with in Bombay Dreams.  SHARABI performed at the 2014 Jewish Culture Festival in Kraków, Poland

Narayan is also lead singer of the band D A R U N A M with Radovan Jovicevic, founding member of Yugoslavia's Grupa Zana. The band brings together the melodies and rhythms from three countries: America, India and Serbia. He recorded with D A R U N A M bandmate Radovan Jovicevic the single Have Me for the 2007 film And Then Came Love starring Vanessa Williams. Narayan and Jovicevic have released the 2007 EP All That's Beautiful Must Die and the title track's video featuring Janina Gavankar. Their album of Electronic Lounge/World Gypsy music with Canadian clarinetist Milan Milosevic entitled The Last Angel on Earth was released live on CBC national radio in Canada in 2010.  D A R U N A M is currently collaborating on an original theatre piece with playwright Aditi Kapil.  Their untitled piece was selected to the Berkeley Repertory Theatre's 2014 Ground Floor Writer's Summer Residency Lab.

Filmography
Law & Order: Special Victims Unit (2001 Season 3) (TV series)
The Sopranos (2004 Season 5) (TV series) – Sukhjit Khan
Quarter Life Crisis (2006) – Jonathan
Hiding Divya (2006) – Irfana Auntie's son
Two Men in Shoulder Stand (2006) (short)
M.O.N.Y. (2007) (TV Movie) – Sunil Ramesh 
Lipstick Jungle (2008 Pilot) (TV series)
Cashmere Mafia (2008 Pilot) (TV series)
Mayor of N.Y. (Pilot Episode)
As the World Turns (TV series)
The Love Guru (2008) – Rajneesh
Click and Clack's As the Wrench Turns (2008 Season 3) (TV series)
Radha (2008) (short)
The Order (2009) 
Three (2009) 
Clap Clap (2009) (short)
Nurse Jackie (2010) (TV series) – Paramedic
Wall Street: Money Never Sleeps (2010)
The Last Airbender (2010) – Fire Nation Head Prison Guard 
Rubicon (2010) (TV series) – Bob Standard
Good Night Good Morning (2010) (PVR Cinemas) – Turya / songwriter / soundtrack artist
Walkaway (2010) (Reliance pictures / Big Cinemas) – Darius / songwriter / soundtrack artist
A Cinderella Story: Once Upon a Song (2011) – Ravi / Tony Gupta 
Unforgettable (2011) (TV series) – Sami
The Protector (2011 Pilot) (TV series) 
Deception (2012) (TV series) – Plastic Surgeon
The Following (2013) (TV series) – FBI Analyst Reece
99 Homes (2013) – Khanna
Grey's Anatomy (2014)  (TV series) – Eric Choudry
The Blacklist (2019) (TV Series)  - Arjun
Bull (2019) (TV Series) - George
Emergence (2019) (TV Series) - Justin

Stage 
Fame by DeSilva, Margoshes, Fernandez (1992) - Pittsburgh CLO, Pittsburgh, Pennsylvania 
Mame by Jerry Herman (1993) Theater of the Stars, Atlanta, Georgia
Godspell by Stephen Schwartz (1994) The Muny, St. Louis, Missouri
Miss Saigon, the Second National Tour by Schoenberg and Boubil (1995-1999) - Miss Saigon Tour, North America
Love's Labor's Lost by William Shakespeare (1999) - Shakespeare and Company, Lenox, Massachusetts
Romeo and Juliet by William Shakespeare (2001) - Shakespeare and Company, Lenox, Massachusetts
Largo by David Henry Hwang (2001) - Powerhouse-New York Stage and Film, Poughkeepsie, New York
The Winter's Tale by Shakespeare (2002) - Missouri Repertory Theatre, Kansas City, Missouri
Indian Ink by Tom Stoppard (East Coast premiere - 2002) - The Wilma Theater, Philadelphia, Pennsylvania
Fucking A by Suzan-Lori Parks (World premiere - 2003) - The Joseph Papp Public Theater, New York City, New York
Metamorphoses by Mary Zimmerman (2003) - The Repertory Theater of St. Louis, St. Louis, Missouri
Bombay Dreams by A.R. Rahman (Original Broadway cast - 2004) - Drama League nomination, New York City, New York
The People Next Door by Henry Adam (American premiere - 2006) - Yale Repertory Theater, New Haven, Connecticut
SIDD: the musical by Andrew Frank (World premiere - 2006) - New World Stages, New York City, New York
subUrbia by Eric Bogosian (Revival - 2006) - Second Stage Theater, New York City, New York
The Boys from Syracuse by George Abbott, Lorenz Hart, and Richard Rodgers (Revival - 2006) - CenterStage, Baltimore, Maryland
Falsettoland with a book by James Lapine, music and lyrics by William Finn (Revival - 2007) - NAATCO, New York City, New York 
Les Misérables by Victor Hugo (Revival - 2007) - The Muny, St. Louis, Missouri
Cyrano by Rostand (2009) - CenterStage, Baltimore, Maryland
The Lisbon Traviata by Terrence McNally (Revival - 2010) - The Kennedy Center, Washington DC
Yeast Nation by Mark Hollmann and Greg Kotis (NYC Premiere - 2011) - New York International Fringe Festival, New York City, New York
The Rivals by Richard Brinsley Sheridan (2011) - CenterStage, Baltimore, Maryland
Two Gentlemen of Verona (musical) by Galt MacDermot and John Guare (2012) - Shakespeare Theatre Company, Washington D.C. 
Glengarry Glen Ross by David Mamet (Revival - 2012) - La Jolla Playhouse, La Jolla, California
Gettin' the Band Back Together with a book by Ken Davenport and The Grundelshotz, with additional material by Sarah Saltzberg, and music and lyrics by Mark Allen (2013) - George Street Playhouse, New Brunswick, New Jersey
Thumbprint - a Chamber Opera with a book by Susan Yankowitz, music by Kamala Shankaram (2014) - Prototype Festival, New York City, New York
My Fair Lady (Broadway revival - 2018) - Vivian Beaumont Theater, New York City, New York
Gettin' the Band Back Together (Original Broadway cast - 2018) - Belasco Theatre, New York City, New York
Merrily We Roll Along (Off-Broadway revival - 2019) - Roundabout Theater Company,  New York City, New York
The Who's Tommy (2019) - The Kennedy Center, Washington, D.C.
Bliss (2020) - 5th Avenue Theatre, Seattle, Washington
Company (Broadway revival - 2021) - Bernard B. Jacobs Theatre,  New York City, New York

References

External links
 
 
 
 And Then Came Love filmsite 
 Padhmashree Kadri Gopalnath's website

American male film actors
Male actors from Pittsburgh
American male actors of Indian descent
Living people
1973 births